Stade Auguste Denise is a multi-use stadium in San Pédro, Côte d'Ivoire.  It is currently used mostly for football matches. It serves as a home ground of Séwé Sports de San Pedro. The stadium holds 8,000 people.

Football venues in Ivory Coast
Sport in Bas-Sassandra District
Buildings and structures in Bas-Sassandra District
San-Pédro, Ivory Coast